Marc Favreau (Sol),  (November 9, 1929 – December 17, 2005) was a Quebecois television and film actor and poet.

Favreau began his television career as a regular on La Boîte à surprise, a long-running children's television show on Radio-Canada.  At that time, he was teamed with another clown in an act called Bim et Sol. Favreau developed Sol's monologues into an enormously popular one-man show. Favreau then teamed up with another clown for Sol et Bouton. Finally, Favreau created, with Luc Durand a  popular television series called Sol et Gobelet.

Later, he played numerous roles on stage and on several television series on Canadian television, such as Parlez-moi, an instructional program on the French language on TVOntario in the late 1970s. Many English Canadian children got their first exposure to Quebec French through Favreau's work. He is best remembered for the witty deconstructions of the French language which he invented for Sol.

See also
Culture of Quebec
Television of Quebec
Cinema of Quebec

External links

Marc Favreau obit at CBC News
Marc Favreau  at Find-a-Grave

1929 births
2005 deaths
Knights of the National Order of Quebec
Officers of the Order of Canada
Canadian male television actors
Canadian male film actors
Canadian clowns
Deaths from cancer in Quebec